The first season of Srugim, is an Israeli television drama which originally aired on Yes TV between 23 June 2008 and 6 October 2008. It was directed by Laizy Shapiro, who co-created it with Hava Divon.

Cast

Main
Ohad Knoller as Dr. Nethaniel "Nati" Brenner
Amos Tamam as Amir Yechezkel
Ya'el Sharoni as Yifat
Tali Sharon as Hodaya Baruchin
Sharon Fauster as Reut Rosen

Recurring
Sara von Schwarze as Chaya
Ma'ayan Weinstock as Elisheva Rosen
Moti Brecher as Yochai
Noa Kooler as Naama
Zohar Strauss as Dr. Avri Sagiv
Liat Harlev as Shani
Yuval Scharf as Nitzan

Plot
Yifat and Hodaya, who went to an all-girls school together, now share an apartment in Katamon, the hub of religious singles' social life in Jerusalem. Yifat meets Nati, a childhood friend who is now a successful doctor, and he introduces the two women to his roommate Amir, a recently divorced teacher. Reut, a high-earning accountant who is also a religious feminist, joins their small band. The five are all Religious Zionist, unmarried and in their late twenties or early thirties, and must cope with a society that expects people to marry early.

Yifat falls for Nati, who seems oblivious. When she confesses her feelings, he admits he knew it all along but does not reciprocate. Hodaya, who is becoming less pious, meets Avri, a secular archaeologist, and dates him but does not tell him she is religious. Amir must deal with the stigma of being divorced, which hampers his chances to enter a new relationship; when he encounters his divorcee, Na'ama, their mutual loneliness leads them to have sex. They must divorce again in a Rabbinical court. Reut wants to cantillate the haftara and convinces the initially reluctant Yochai to teach her. Though rejecting the notion of a woman chanting at first, he soon becomes enamored with her. When he cannot control himself and kisses Reut, he immediately proposes marriage. Unsure, she decides to keep dating him, and also sees another man simultaneously. Hodaya profanes the Sabbath for the first time in her life and then lets Avri drive her to the beach, where she tells him the truth.

Reut begins to lose interest in Yochai. Although intending to consummate her relationship with Avri, Hodaya flinches at the last moment and decides to end their romance, stating the differences between them are too great. Tired of Jerusalem, Yifat moves to a quiet settlement.  Amir begins visiting Yifat and the two become close friends. Nati tries to approach her again, angering Amir. The two come to blows, but eventually reconcile. Amir and Yifat decide to marry. After meeting her niece, who was evicted from Gaza and subsequently lost her faith, Hodaya resolves to disaffiliate. Reut breaks up with Yochai and goes on a long trip to India.

Episodes

Production
Laizy Shapiro and Hava Divon became acquainted while studying in the Ma'ale School of Television, Film and the Arts. In 2005, the Gesher Multicultural Film Fund announced its intention to create a picture about religious-secular relations and held a contest for a script. Shapiro and Divon submitted a treatment for a romantic comedy about a relationship between a bachelor living in Ramat Gan and a young settler from Hebron. Shapiro told her he had a similar idea already in his second year in Ma'ale, in 2000. Their entry was rejected, but they met Jonathan Aroch, a veteran producer, who served as their mentor during the competition. Aroch suggested they write another outline. Their second script concerned a religious single from Jerusalem named Nati, who is frustrated with dating and has resolved to give it only another year and then marry the first woman he encounters. This second entry was also declined. Shapiro and Divon return to their regular jobs.

A year later, Aroch contacted both again, suggesting they make a television series about the religious singles scene in Jerusalem, the so-called "Katamon swamp" or "marsh". A real sociological phenomenon, the "swamp" is a large concentration of middle-class Religious Zionist men and women who remain unmarried at a relatively advanced age, a trend causing much strain in their society. Divon and Shapiro created a basic outline for a show, and conceived of the five main characters. They planned to name the series, Kovshei Katamon ("Conquerors of Katamon"), which is the name of one of the area's main streets and a reference to the neighborhood's "conquest" by members of the "swamp". The studios refused to accept the title. On 20 July 2006, Ma'ariv first reported about contacts between Aroch and the television companies of Keshet and Yes, concerning the future purchase of the series, labeled under the working title Sex v'ha'Ir haQdosha ("Sex and the Holy City"). It was reported that due to the high production costs expected, the companies considered broadcasting it first on satellite and later on terrestrial television, to ensure maximal revenues.

After Yes bought the rights, Aroch hired a group of screenwriters, many of them Ma'ale alumni and residents of the "swamp" themselves. Divon, Shapiro and their team wrote a full screenplay for a first season of 15 episodes. Shapiro was also chosen to direct it. Auditions were held in September and October 2007. Towards the end of the second month, Aroch himself selected the final name of the show, Srugim –  alluding to the crocheted skullcaps worn by national religious men, which distinguish them from other sectors. Principal photography was held in the winter of 2008. All studio filming was carried out in Tel-Aviv, but external photography occurred in Jerusalem and in Nofei Prat, which served as the fictional settlement to which Yifat moves.

Ratings
The first season aired on the satellite channel Yes Stars on 23 June 2008 and ended on 6 October. It became an immediate success, reaching the third place among satellite shows on its day of transmission. However, most of its audience watched it via the internet, on Yes' website: the first episode had 240,000 hits within days of being posted on the web. The interest Srugim generated in the Religious Zionist sector was the main source of its popularity; many of its more conservative viewers did not even own a television due to religious grounds. To answer public demand, Shapiro organized public screenings across the country, for which tickets were sold. Five weeks after the premiere, Yes announced that it intended to commission another season in light of the show's success. A week before the next one aired, the first season's episodes had 3 million views on the internet.

Keshet also purchased the show and ran the first season on the terrestrial Channel 2 between 18 April and 25 July 2009. All 15 episodes entered the weekly lists of the 20 most popular shows on television. On average, the Israel Audience Research Board estimated it had a rating of 13.85%, a share of 22.4% and an audience of 251,000 households. Its highest record was reached with the 13th episode, broadcast on 11 July, which had a 16.9% rating, 29% share and a viewership of 309,000 households. The season's lowest point was the 6th episode, on 23 May, which had a 10.5% rating, 16% share and an audience of 191,000 households.

Awards
Srugim had six nominations in the Israeli Academy of Film and Television Awards Ceremony for 2009, held on 28 August. It won four: the Award for the Best Drama Series; the Award for the Best Script, which went to the writers' team headed by Shapiro and Divon; the Award for Best Actress, which was granted to Ya'el Sharoni, and the Award for Best Costume Design, given to Seri Sobol. Shapiro was nominated for the Best Director but lost it to Oded Davidoff, who made Pillars of Smoke. Ohad Knoller was nominated for Best Actor, yet the award was won by Moshe Ivgy of The Arbitrator. Tali Sharon was also nominated for the Best Actress for her role in Srugim.

Source:

References

2008 Israeli television seasons